Sir Patrick Muir Renison GCMG (24 March 1911 – 10 November 1965) was a British colonial administrator.

Biography
Renison was born in 1911 in Rock Ferry, England. He attended Uppingham School, and later Corpus Christi College, Cambridge.

He entered the Colonial Administrative Service in 1932 and was seconded to the Colonial Office. In 1936 he moved to Ceylon where he was appointed to the Ceylon Civil Service. He would remain in Ceylon until 1944, during which time he would hold a number of Civil Service posts across the country.

Following the Second World War, Renison was asked to assist the Colonial Office's plans for post-war recruitment. In 1947 he returned to the United Kingdom whereupon he was appointed an Assistant Secretary in the Colonial Office. In 1948 he began work as Colonial Secretary of Trinidad and Tobago.

Rension was appointed Governor of British Honduras in 1952, a post he held until 1955. On 25 October 1955 he took up the position of Governor of British Guiana. He left the post in 1958 and served as Governor of Kenya between 1959 and 1962.

He died in Marylebone, London on 10 November 1965, aged 54. His daughter, Anne Willoughby Renison, married Hugh Cholmondeley, 5th Baron Delamere of Pitt River (b. 18 Jan 1934).

References

1911 births
1965 deaths
Alumni of Corpus Christi College, Cambridge
Knights Grand Cross of the Order of St Michael and St George
People from Birkenhead
British Trinidad and Tobago people
Chief secretaries (British Empire)
Governors of British Honduras
Governors of British Guiana
Colonial governors and administrators of Kenya
British Kenya people
British people in British Ceylon